Nenad Begović (born January 6, 1980) is a Serbian former football player who played in the First League of Serbia and Montenegro, Second League of Serbia and Montenegro, Ligue 1, Kazakhstan Premier League, Russian Premier League, Azerbaijan Premier League, Israeli Premier League, Canadian Soccer League, Serbian First League, and the Indonesia Super League.

Career

Club career
Begović began his career in the First League of FR Yugoslavia with OFK Beograd and had stints with FK Radnički Beograd, and OFK Mladenovac. In 2005, he went abroad to France to play in the Ligue 2 with FC Sète 34. The following year he played with NK Interblock, and FC Baulmes. In 2007, he signed with FC Kairat of the Kazakhstan Premier League, and he had a stint in Russia with FC Luch Vladivostok. He also played with F.C. Ashdod, and Simurq PIK in the Israeli Premier League, and Azerbaijan Premier League.

In 2010, he went overseas to Canada to sign with Brantford Galaxy of the Canadian Soccer League. In his debut season he helped Brantford win their first CSL Championship. In 2012, he signed with rivals London City, and was appointed club captain. During his time with London he helped the club reach the postseason in 2013 for the first time since the 2000 season. After the conclusion of the CSL season he returned to Serbia to sign with FK Zemun of the Serbian First League. In 2015, he signed with PSM Makassar of the Indonesia Super League.

International career
Begović received five call-ups to the FR Yugoslavia under-21 side under coach Nikola Rakojević during the 2002 UEFA European Under-21 Championship qualification rounds from 2000 to 2001.

Managerial career
After the sudden departure of manager Stanislav Zvezdić, the coaching responsibilities were given to Begović as a player/coach role. He took the team from the bottom of the standings and transformed them into a playoff contender. Despite the change in performance London still missed the final playoff berth by five points.

References

External links

 Player page on the official Luch-Energiya website 
 

Serbian footballers
Serbian expatriate footballers
Living people
1980 births
Serbian expatriate sportspeople in Switzerland
Footballers from Belgrade
Serbian expatriate sportspeople in France
OFK Beograd players
FK Radnički Beograd players
OFK Mladenovac players
FK Zemun players
Serbian expatriate sportspeople in Kazakhstan
FC Sète 34 players
Expatriate footballers in France
Serbian expatriate sportspeople in Israel
Expatriate footballers in Switzerland
Expatriate footballers in Slovenia
FC Kairat players
Liga 1 (Indonesia) players
Expatriate footballers in Kazakhstan
FC Luch Vladivostok players
Russian Premier League players
Serbian expatriate sportspeople in Slovenia
Expatriate footballers in Russia
F.C. Ashdod players
Israeli Premier League players
Expatriate footballers in Israel
Serbian expatriate sportspeople in Russia
Expatriate footballers in Indonesia
PSM Makassar players
Canadian Soccer League (1998–present) players
London City players
Brantford Galaxy players
Serbian First League players
Canadian Soccer League (1998–present) managers
Association football midfielders
Association football player-managers
Serbian football managers